Béchar Ouakda Airport  is a public use airport located near Béchar, Béchar Province, Algeria.

See also
List of airports in Algeria

References

External links 
 
Google Maps - Ouakda

Airports in Algeria
Buildings and structures in Béchar Province